Country Vid Grid is a tile-matching full motion video puzzle game developed by Geffen Records and published by Jasmine Multimedia Publishing for Windows in May 1995. It is a spin-off of the original Vid Grid, which was released in June 1994, and is the third and last entry in the franchise of the same name.

Similarly with the previous two titles, the main objective of the players is to resolve and finish a jigsaw puzzle on time before the music video that is being played on the background ends. Produced by series creator Norman Beil and conceived as a joint-venture between MCA Nashville and Jasmine Multimedia, Country Vid Grid puts emphasis on country music as its main theme unlike the original Vid Grid and Kid Vid Grid, which were themed after rock music and cartoons respectively.

Gameplay 

 For further information about the gameplay, see: Gameplay of Vid Grid
As with the previous two titles in the series, Country Vid Grid is a tile-matching FMV puzzle game where the main objective is to reassemble the music video correctly on time before the song playing on the background finishes across five levels in total, each one featuring nine puzzles to be solved and they increase in both complexity and difficulty as players progress further, while an extra puzzle is unlocked after reaching the fourth level. A source of difficulty that is shared between each entry are the videos themselves, as most of them feature quick cuts, scenery changes, among other distractions within. Like the two previous games, the scoring system is based upon the level of complexity from puzzles and how long it took players to resolve said puzzles. During gameplay, players have a variety of options to choose from such as solving or reset the puzzle.

Development and release 
Country Vid Grid was produced by series creator Norman Beil, who was also involved with the previous two title, as a joint-venture between MCA Nashville and Jasmine Multimedia Publishing, who have been involved with all Vid Grid titles since the first entry. The game launched in May 1995 and it was an expansion of the original's concept but delving into the country music genre instead of the first game's rock-themed approach and the second game's cartoon thematic. A conversion of Country Vid Grid was developed and completed by High Voltage Software for the Atari Jaguar CD, but it went unreleased for unknown reasons and no prototypes of this port has surfaced to date.

Audio 
The soundtrack of Country Vid Grid consists mainly of licensed songs, emphasizing solely on country music combining genres and subgenres such as neotraditional country. Producer Norman Beil stated the artists were happy to license their music for the project:

References 

1995 video games
Cancelled Atari Jaguar games
Full motion video based games
High Voltage Software games
Interactive movie video games
Puzzle video games
Single-player video games
Tile-matching video games
Video games developed in the United States
Video game spin-offs
Windows games
Windows-only games